Sid Ali Boudina (born May 7, 1990) is an Algerian rower. He competed at the 2016 Summer Olympics in the men's single sculls event, in which he placed 23rd.

He represented Algeria at the 2020 Summer Olympics in the Men's Lightweight Double Sculls with partner Kamel Ait Daoud. They finished in 17th place.

References

External links
 
 
 

1990 births
Living people
Algerian male rowers
Olympic rowers of Algeria
Rowers at the 2016 Summer Olympics
Competitors at the 2018 Mediterranean Games
Competitors at the 2019 African Games
African Games gold medalists for Algeria
African Games silver medalists for Algeria
African Games medalists in rowing
Mediterranean Games competitors for Algeria
Rowers at the 2020 Summer Olympics
21st-century Algerian people
20th-century Algerian people